McKinley is a neighborhood in the U.S. city of Minneapolis on its northside that is bound to the north by Dowling Avenue North, to the south by Lowry Avenue North, to the west by Dupont Avenue North, and to the east by the Mississippi River. It is part of the larger Camden community. The neighborhood is named for William McKinley, the 25th president of the United States. Many of the homes are two-story, single-family homes with wood frames; bungalows and some small stucco Tudor-style homes. Most of the houses were built between 1910 and 1930. Perkins Hill is the neighborhood park, located between 34th and 35th avenues North near Interstate 94.

References

External links

Neighborhoods in Minneapolis
Minnesota populated places on the Mississippi River